Olawunmi Emmanuel Arowolo (born 7 August 1997) is a Nigerian sprinter. He competed at the 2018 Commonwealth Games in the 200 metres and 4x100 metres relay. He was a member of the Nigerian team that qualified for the final only to suffer disqualification. In 2018, he competed at the African Championships in Asaba and won a silver medal in the 4×100 metres relay. In 2019, he was a member of the Nigerian  relay team that won a silver medal in the 2019 African Games.

Emmanuel Arowolo gained his first experience in international competitions at the 2016 U20 World Championships in Bydgoszcz, Poland, where he dropped out over 200 meters with 21.16 seconds in the semifinals, as well as with the Nigerian 4 x 100 metres relay.

References

External links

1997 births
Living people
African Games medalists in athletics (track and field)
African Games silver medalists for Nigeria
Athletes (track and field) at the 2018 Commonwealth Games
Athletes (track and field) at the 2019 African Games
Commonwealth Games competitors for Nigeria
Nigerian male sprinters